"Komakino" is a song by English post-punk band Joy Division. It was released in June 1980 by record label Factory as a  flexi disc intended to be given away free in select record shops. 75,000 copies were pressed. The tracks are outtakes from the recording session for the album Closer. The single's B-sides, "Incubation" and "As You Said", are both instrumentals.

"Komakino" and "Incubation" appear on the 1988 compilation Substance, and "As You Said" was added in the expanded reissue of the album in 2015 and in the B-side of New Order's Video 586 single. All three tracks are also collected on the 4-CD 1997 compilation Heart and Soul.

The Komakino Site, also known as the Komakino Remains or the Komakino Stone Circle, is an ancient set of structures in Japan's Aomori Prefecture consisting of three rings of stones and a fourth, partial outer ring. There are no obvious parallels between the Joy Division song and the site, in any descriptive or literal sense. The name was used in 1979 for a German tape label apparently predating and perhaps inspiring Joy Division's title. It has since been used for an Italian fanzine, a number of groups, most prominently a German techno group active since 1989, and an avant-garde menswear shop in Vancouver, Canada.

Track listing

References

External links 

 

Joy Division songs
1980 singles
Songs written by Bernard Sumner
Songs written by Peter Hook
Songs written by Stephen Morris (musician)
Songs written by Ian Curtis
Factory Records singles
1980 songs